Pseudo-Chalcidian vase painting is an important style of black-figure Greek vase painting, dating to the 6th century BC.

Pseudo-Chalcidian vase painting was strongly influenced by Chalcidian vase painting, but also shows influences from Attic and Corinthian vase painting. The potters used the Ionic alphabet (and not the Chalcidian one) for added inscriptions. The clays were of a different fabric from those used for Chalcidian pottery. By now, about 60 vases of the style are known (they were compiled for the first time by Andreas Rumpf). The potters/painters may have been the successors of those who produced Chalcidian pottery, as well as some potters newly immigrated to Etruria. 

Pseudo-Chalcidian vase painting can be subdivided in two groups. The older of the two is the Polyphemus Group. It produced the majority of known vases, mainly neck amphorae and oinochoai. Most show groups of animals, mythological imagery is rare (Herakles, Hephaistos). The vessels were found in Etruria and Sicily, but also in Marseille and Vix. The more recent and less productive memnon Group, to which 12 vessels can be ascribed, had a much less extensive distribution, limited exclusively to Etruria and Sicily. Apart from a single small oinochoe, it only produced neck amphorae, usually painted with animals and horsemen. There is a single depiction of a chariot race, as well as one amphora with Odysseus and Circe.

Bibliography 
 Fulvio Canciani: Eine neue Amphora aus Vulci und das Problem der pseudochalkidischen Vasen, In: Jahrbuch des Deutschen Archäologischen Instituts 95 (1980), p. 140-162
 Thomas Mannack: Griechische Vasenmalerei. Eine Einführung''. Theiss, Stuttgart 2002,  .
 Matthias Steinhart: Pseudochalkidische Vasenmalerei. In: Der Neue Pauly, vol. 10, cols. 516-517.

Ancient Greece in art and culture
Ancient Greek vase-painting styles